Roberto Marchionni (September 23, 1965), known by his pen name Menotti, is an Italian comic book artist and screenwriter. He started his career in Bologna during the early 1980s and was published in Frigidaire, Cyborg, Comic Art and Blue. By the end of the 1990s he moved to Rome, where he worked as a screenwriter on several Italian TV series, such as Un posto al sole, Incantesimo, La squadra, 7 vite. He co-wrote They Call Me Jeeg, an Italian superhero film, nominated for best screenplay at the David di Donatello Award 2016.

References

External links
 Menotti at Lambiek Comiclopedia

 Menotti at Writers Guild Italia
 Menotti: official website

1965 births
Living people